Pervomaysky is a rural locality (a settlement) in Malyshevskoye Rural Settlement, Selivanovsky District, Vladimir Oblast, Russia. The population was 343 as of 2010. There are 8 streets.

Geography 
Pervomaysky is located 41 km southwest of Krasnaya Gorbatka (the district's administrative centre) by road. Troitsko-Kolychyovo is the nearest rural locality.

References 

Rural localities in Selivanovsky District